Indomania or Indophilia refer to the special interest that India, Indians and their cultures and traditions have generated across the world, more specifically among the cultures and civilisations of the Indian subcontinent, as well those of the Arab and Western world (particularly in Germany). The initial British interest in governing their newly absorbed territories awoke the interest in India, in particular its culture and ancient history. Later the people with interests in Indian aspects came to be known as Indologists and their subject as Indology. Its opposite is Indophobia.

History

Historically, Indian civilization which is one of the ancient great powers has been widely regarded as an amalgamation of diverse range of rich cultures. Due to its ancient civilization and contributions, there are accounts of notable people who visited the nation and reviewed it with praises.

Philostratus, in his book Life of Apollonius of Tyana, recognized the experience of Apollonius in India, he writes that Apollonius described:

2nd century Roman philosopher Arrian applauded India to be the nation of free people, he cites that he found no slaves in India at all, and he further added:

During the Islamic Golden Age, polymaths Al-Biruni, the founder of Indology, authored the Tarikh Al-Hind (Researches on India), which recorded the political and military history of India and covered India's cultural, scientific, social and religious history in detail. Similar writings on India were also found from the work of Al-Masudi.
Muslim rule of India however mainly took place much later.

Influence of India on Southeast Asia

With expansion of Indosphere cultural influence of Greater India, through transmission of Hinduism in Southeast Asia and the Silk Road transmission of Buddhism leading to Indianization of Southeast Asia through formation of non-Indian southeast Asian native Indianized kingdoms which adopted sanskritized language and other Indian elements such as the honorific titles, naming of people, naming of places, mottos of organisations and educational institutes as well as adoption of Indian architecture, martial arts, Indian music and dance, traditional Indian clothing, and Indian cuisine, a process which has also been aided by the ongoing historic expansion of Indian diaspora.

18th and 19th centuries

The perception of Indian history and culture by Europeans was fluctuating between two extremes in the 18th and 19th centuries. Though the 19th century European writers had seen India as a cradle of civilization, their romantic vision of India was gradually replaced by "Indophobia", which marginalized Indian history and culture.

Friedrich Schlegel wrote in a letter to Tieck that India was the source of all languages, thoughts and poems, and that "everything" came from India. In the 18th century, Voltaire wrote:
I am convinced that everything has come down to us from the banks of the Ganges, – astronomy, astrology, metempsychosis, etc... It is very important to note that some 2,500 years ago at the least Pythagoras went from Samos to the Ganges to learn geometry...But he would certainly not have undertaken such a strange journey had the reputation of the Indians' science not been long established in Europe.

Much of the early enthusiasm for Indian culture can be traced to the influence of Sir William Jones. Jones was only the second known Englishman to master Sanskrit, after Charles Wilkins. His insight that the grammar and vocabulary of Sanskrit bore a resemblance to Greek and Latin was a key point in the development of the concept of the Indo-European family of languages.  In February 1786 Jones declared Sanskrit to be 'more perfect than the Greek, more copious than the Latin, and more exquisitely refined than either.' Jones translated into English the drama The Recognition of Sakuntala of Kalidasa and published it in 1789. The Calcutta edition was an immediate success and two London editions followed within three years. Jones also discovered that chess and algebra were of Indian origin.  Every branch of Indian studies owed something to his inspiration.

An important development during the British Raj period was the influence Hindu traditions began to take on western thought and new religious movements. Goethe borrowed from Kalidasa for the "Vorspiel auf dem Theater" in Faust. An early champion of Indian-inspired thought in the west was Arthur Schopenhauer, who in the 1850s  advocated ethics based on an  "Aryan-Vedic theme of spiritual self-conquest" as opposed to the ignorant drive toward earthly utopianism of the superficially this-worldly "Jewish" spirit. At the end of the introduction to the World as Will and Representation, Arthur Schopenhauer claimed that the rediscovery of the ancient Indian tradition would be one of the great events in the history of the West.

Goethe and Schopenhauer were riding a crest of scholarly discovery, most notably the work done by Sir William Jones. (Goethe likely read Kalidasa's The Recognition of Sakuntala in Jones' translation.) However, the discovery of the world of Sanskrit literature moved beyond German and British scholars and intellectuals—Henry David Thoreau was a sympathetic reader of the Bhagavad Gita—and even beyond the humanities. In the early days of the Periodic Table, scientists referred to as yet undiscovered elements with the use of Sanskrit prefixes (see Mendeleev's predicted elements).

Scholars like Schlegel also influenced some historians like Friedrich Creuzer, Joseph Görres and Carl Ritter, who wrote history books that laid more emphasis on India than usual.

Max Muller delivered a series of lectures regarding the religion and literature of India. In his fourth lecture, he said:

Helena Blavatsky moved to India in 1879, and her Theosophical Society, founded in New York in 1875, evolved into a peculiar mixture of western occultism and Hindu mysticism over the last years of her life. 
Hinduism-inspired elements in Theosophy were also inherited by the spin-off movements of Ariosophy and Anthroposophy and ultimately contributed to the renewed New Age boom of the 1960s to 1980s, the term New Age itself deriving from Blavatsky's 1888  The Secret Doctrine.

20th century

The Hindu reform movements reached Western audiences in the wake of the sojourn of Swami Vivekananda to the World Parliament of Religions in Chicago in 1893. Vivekananda founded the Ramakrishna Mission, a Hindu missionary organization still active today.

Influential in spreading Hinduism to a western audience were A.C. Bhaktivedanta Swami Prabhupada (Hare Krishna movement), Sri Aurobindo, Mata Amritanandamayi, Meher Baba, Osho, Maharishi Mahesh Yogi (Transcendental Meditation), Sathya Sai Baba, Mother Meera, among others.

Swami Prabhavananda, founder and head of the Vedanta Society of Southern California, remarked that:

During the 1960s and 1970s, there was a similar phase of Indomania in the Western world, with a rise of interest in Indian culture. This was largely associated with the hippie counterculture movement; the hippie trail, for example, was a journey that many Westerners undertook to India during this period. The Hare Krishna movement gained popularity in the 1960s. Indian filmmakers such as the Bengali auteur Satyajit Ray as well as Bengali musicians such as Ravi Shankar gained increasing exposure in the Western world. Indian musical influence, particularly the use of the sitar, became evident in jazz (see Indo jazz) and rock music, among popular Western artists such as The Beatles (see The Beatles in India), The Rolling Stones, Led Zeppelin and Jimi Hendrix, among others, leading to the development of psychedelic music genres such as raga rock and psychedelic rock.

21st century
In the 21st century, a notable amount of Indomania has been recorded due to India's improvement related to economic conditions, political changes, activism, etc.

Politics
India is the world's largest democracy. The democratic nature of its politics has led many world leaders to praise Indian politics. George W. Bush commented: "India is a great example of democracy. It is very devout, has diverse religious heads, but everyone is comfortable about their religion. The world needs India." During the Namaste Trump rally in February 2020, US President Donald Trump declared "America loves India. America respects India. And America will always be faithful and loyal friends to the Indian people."

Fareed Zakaria, in his book The Post-American World, described George W. Bush as "being the most pro-Indian president in American history." In November 2012, Israel's President Shimon Peres remarked, "I think India is the greatest show of how so many differences in language, in sects can coexist facing great suffering and keeping full freedom."

Education
Indian languages have been taught in multiple nations, including the United States. In 2012, then prime minister of Australia, Julia Gillard talked about Hindi and other prominent Asian languages to be taught in Australia.

A BBC report in 2012 showed how schools in the United Kingdom work together with online Indian mathematics tutors to teach students in the classroom.

Science
Despite anti-Indian sentiment in Pakistan, the Pakistani newspaper The Nation published a report on 7 November 2013, heading "Don't hate, appreciate", in which they praised India's Mars Mission; the report further noted, "Wars were fought, and martyrs were born. But, it's over. We are not in the race anymore. One of us has been to the moon, and now has their eyes set on Mars to become the first Asian country to reach the milestone."

In response to the mission, the South China Morning Post regarded India as "full of vigour and vitality, boasts obvious advantages and development potential."

By country
In 2007, a poll conducted by GlobeScan for BBC World Service reported that the strongest pro-India sentiments were found in Indonesia, with 72% expressing a favourable view.

India shares strong cultural, linguistic and historic bonds with Bangladesh. India supported Bangladesh's independence struggle in 1971, and Bangladeshi opinion is generally favourable to India. In 2014, a Pew Research Center survey found that Israelis and Russians are the most pro-Indian sentiments worldwide, with 90% and 85% respectively expressing a favourable view of India.

Media

Gallup Poll 2016
As per Gallup's survey for Americans' favorite countries, India was polled as the sixth most favorable nation, with 75% having a positive view and 18% negative.

BBC World Service polls

BBC poll 2017

BBC poll 2014

BBC poll 2007
The  international polling firm GlobeScan, which was commissioned by the BBC World Service to conduct the survey.

See also
 Indology
 Bibliography of India
 Neo-Vedanta
 Orientalism
 Spirituality

References

Further reading
Meenakshi Jain, The India They Saw (co-edited with Sandhya Jain, 4 Volumes, Prabhat Prakashan), 
R.C. Majumdar. Classical accounts of India

Indian culture
Admiration of foreign cultures
Orientalism by type
Nationalism in India